Electra was a teletext service in the United States that was in operation from the early 1980s up until 1993, when it was shut down due to a lack of funding, and discontinuation of teletext-capable television sets by the only US television manufacturer offering teletext capability at the time, Zenith. It was owned, operated and maintained by Cincinnati-based Taft Broadcasting (specifically at their flagship station, WKRC-TV, which had debuted the service in their area first) and Tulsa, Oklahoma-based Satellite Syndicated Systems (SSS), in cooperation with cable/satellite TV station Superstation WTBS (now TBS), who carried Electra's data on their vertical blanking interval. SSS's own TV network, the Satellite Program Network (later renamed to Tempo Television), carried the service before it was shut down in 1989 (SSS/Tempo having sold their transponder space to NBC, who used it to launch CNBC). The service was also available to C-band satellite dish users via the Galaxy 1 and Satcom 3R satellites.

Electra was America's answer to the British Ceefax or ORACLE systems, providing news headlines, weather, entertainment/lifestyle info, and other information. Electra used the World System Teletext (WST) protocol, the same protocol used by Ceefax and ORACLE, as well as by other teletext services in the rest of the European continent.

Electra also carried another teletext service on its higher-numbered pages, an SSS-created service called Tempo Text (originally named Cabletext); it provided pages of 15-minute delayed stock quotes from the NYSE, AMEX and OTC, and the latest business news. Electra occupied pages 100 to 199, while Cabletext/Tempo could be found on pages 201 through 212.

Electra was one of the very few American teletext services in operation. A few other services were offered by some large-market TV stations in the US throughout the 1980s, such as Metrotext from KTTV in Los Angeles and KeyFax from WFLD in Chicago. 

At the time of Electra's closing in 1993, it was the only teletext service in the United States.

References 

1981 establishments in Ohio
1981 establishments in the United States
1993 disestablishments in the United States
Products introduced in 1981
Products and services discontinued in 1993
Teletext
Turner Broadcasting System
Taft Broadcasting